The white-eared tailorbird (Orthotomus cinereiceps) is a species of bird formerly placed in the "Old World warbler" assemblage, it but now placed in the family Cisticolidae.It is found in the Philippine islands of Basilan and West Mindanao.

Description 

EBird describes the bird as "A small, long-billed, long-tailed bird of dense undergrowth in lowland and foothill forest in western Mindanao and Basilan. Olive-green on the back and wings, with an olive-brown tail often held cocked, a pale gray belly, a black hood and chest, and a white ear-spot. Female has a white throat patch. Similar to Rufous-fronted Tailorbird, especially from behind, but has a black hood and white ear-spot. Voice includes monotonous piping notes given in series, a short phrase “pu piiiiiiiii pit,” and a rapid whistled or nasal trill."

Subspecies 
Two subspecies are recognized:

 Orthotomus cinereiceps cinereiceps: Found on Basilan Island
 Orthotomus cinereiceps obscurior: Found in Zamboanga Peninsula. Cotabato. Misamis Oriental,

Habitat and conservation status 
It is found in dense tangles in primary and secondary forest and forest clearings up to 1,000 meters above sea level .

IUCN has assessed this bird as a Least-concern species due to its tolerance to degraded habitat.

References

white-eared tailorbird
Birds of Mindanao
Fauna of Basilan
Endemic birds of the Philippines
white-eared tailorbird
Taxonomy articles created by Polbot